Liga IV Arad is the county football division of Liga IV for clubs based in Arad County, România. The competition is ranked as the fourth tier of the Romanian football league system and it is competed between 12 teams, the winner may or may not be promoted to Liga III, depending on the result of a promotion play-off that is disputed against a winner of the neighboring counties series.

History
In 1968, along with the territorial reorganization of the country, but also due to the large number of requests, the Romanian Football Federation proposes a competitive system in which each county has its own football championship, which will activate the former teams in the regional championship as well as the racing and town championship teams from the previous edition.

Promotion
The champions of each county association play one another in a play-off to promote to the Liga III. Geographical criteria are taken into consideration when the play-offs are drawn. In total there are 41 county champions plus the Bucharest municipal champion.

List of champions

See also

Main Leagues
  Liga I
  Liga II
  Liga III
  Liga IV

County Leagues (Liga IV series)

North–East
  Liga IV Bacău
  Liga IV Botoșani
  Liga IV Iași
  Liga IV Neamț
  Liga IV Suceava
  Liga IV Vaslui

North–West
  Liga IV Bihor
  Liga IV Bistrița-Năsăud
  Liga IV Cluj
  Liga IV Maramureș
  Liga IV Satu Mare
  Liga IV Sălaj

Center
  Liga IV Alba
  Liga IV Brașov
  Liga IV Covasna
  Liga IV Harghita
  Liga IV Mureș
  Liga IV Sibiu

West
  Liga IV Arad
  Liga IV Caraș-Severin
  Liga IV Gorj
  Liga IV Hunedoara
  Liga IV Mehedinți
  Liga IV Timiș

South–West
  Liga IV Argeș
  Liga IV Dâmbovița
  Liga IV Dolj
  Liga IV Olt
  Liga IV Teleorman
  Liga IV Vâlcea

South
  Liga IV Bucharest
  Liga IV Călărași
  Liga IV Giurgiu
  Liga IV Ialomița
  Liga IV Ilfov
  Liga IV Prahova

South–East
  Liga IV Brăila
  Liga IV Buzău
  Liga IV Constanța
  Liga IV Galați
  Liga IV Tulcea
  Liga IV Vrancea

References

External links
 

Arad
Sport in Arad County
4
Rom